Las Cruces is a doom metal band from San Antonio, Texas, United States. It was formed in 1994 by George Trevino out of the ashes of Sound Asylum and Legion.

Discography
S.O.L. (1996) - Brainticket Records
Ringmaster (1998) - Brainticket Records
Stone Deaf Forever (single: "Farewell") (1999) - Red Sun Records
Slave to the Power (single: "The Prisoner") (1999) - Meteorcity Records
I am Vengeance soundtrack (single: "In My Sadness") (1999) - Meteorcity Records
Lowest End EP (2001) - Cross Eyed Records
Dusk (2010) - Brainticket Records
Cosmic Tears (2022) - Ripple Records

References

American doom metal musical groups